Longwantun Town is a town in the northeastern part of Shunyi District, Beijing. The town is situated in a plane southwest of Zhigen and Zhongluo Mountains, and shares border with Dongbuqu Town to its northeast, Yukou Town to its southeast, Zhang and Yang Towns to its south, and Mulin Town to its west. The result of the 2020 census determined that Longwantun Town had 14,212 people residing within it.

This region received its name Longwantun in the Tang dynasty, when Emperor Taizong stationed his troops for a night during his expedition against Goguryeo.

History

Administrative divisions 
In the year 2021, Longwantun Town consisted of 13 villages:

See also 

 List of township-level divisions of Beijing

References 

Towns in Beijing
Shunyi District